Kaliyuga Bheema is a 1991 Indian Kannada film,  directed by  Tiger Prabhakar and produced by N. Ravikumar and H. N. Ramachandra Hande. The film stars Tiger Prabhakar, Khushbu, Sumalatha and Srinath in the lead roles. The film has musical score by Hamsalekha.

Cast

Tiger Prabhakar
Khushbu
Sumalatha
Srinath
Jai Jagadish
Pandari Bai
Baby Arpitha
Master Vinay
Vajramuni
Sudarshan
Sudheer
Doddanna
Vishwa Vijetha
Sundar Krishna Urs
Dheerendra Gopal
Rajanand
Mysore Lokesh
Sadashiva Brahmavar
Sarigama Viji
Negro Johnny
Circus Boranna
Go Ra Bheema Rao
Srishailan

Music

The songs had its lyrics written and composed by Hamsalekha. 
Mother India -
Shaari Shaari Enuthare - Latha Hamsalekha
Bheeme Gowda Ninthidda -
Kai Thutthu Kottole -
Chandamama -
Bhoomigintha Bhaara - swarnalata

References

External links
 

1991 films
1990s Kannada-language films
Films scored by Hamsalekha